Kim Tae-yeon (born 27 August 1986) is a South Korean painter based in Seoul.

Education
 2006–2010 Bachelor of Fine Arts in Oriental Painting from Seoul National University 
 2010–2013 Master of Fine Arts in Oriental Painting from Seoul National University

Exhibitions
 Second solo exhibition: Revived 12 gods, 2013 
 Third solo exhibition: Living Templates, 2014

References

External links 
 Kim Tae-yeon's website

1986 births
South Korean contemporary artists
South Korean painters
Seoul National University alumni
Living people